Pterocaulon virgatum, common name wand blackroot, is a plant species widespread in Latin America and in the West Indies. In the contiguous United States, it has been reported only from Texas and Louisiana. It grows in marshy areas, ditches, sandy loam, etc.

Pterocaulon virgatum is a perennial herb up to 150 cm (60 inches) tall. Leaves are alternate, narrowly linear, green above, white with dense woolly hairs below. Flower heads are arranged in spikes at the ends of branches. There are no ray flowers, only 25-50 yellow disc flowers per head.

References

virgatum
Flora of Texas
Flora of Louisiana
Flora of Mexico
Flora of the Caribbean
Flora of Central America
Flora of South America